"Real Love" is a song written and performed by American singer-songwriter Lucinda Williams. It was released in 2008 as the first single from her ninth album, Little Honey (2008).

The song was featured in the film The Lucky Ones, released in the US on September 26, 2008.

Reception
In their review of Little Honey, Spin stated "Williams goes back to the roots-rock well and takes a long, satisfying swig", and referred to "Real Love" as a "rowdy bar-band rave-up." AllMusic called it "rollicking, with jangling, charging guitars by Doug Pettibone, and Rob Burger on Wurlitzer, and a backing chorus held down by the Bangles' Susanna Hoffs and Matthew Sweet. Its pop/rock bent is tempered by the roiling pace and Williams's trademark Louisiana voice." Rolling Stone singled out the track; "amid boogie-rock riffing, she alternately pledges her heart to a guy, a girl, and an electric guitar. Little Honey proves she's still crushed out on the music."

LA Weekly ranked "Real Love" at No. 3 on their list of Williams' best 11 songs, calling it a "return to the jangle pop/country days of old".

Track listing
CD single
 Radio Edit - 3:13

Charts

References

External links
, official audio (no music video)

2008 songs
2008 singles
Lucinda Williams songs
Songs written by Lucinda Williams
Lost Highway Records singles